D-Crit is the Design Criticism MFA department at the School of Visual Arts in New York City, chaired by Alice Twemlow and co-founded along with Steven Heller in 2006. In Fall 2008, the department enrolled 15 students, who became the inaugural class to complete the two-year program and graduate, in May 2010, with a Design Criticism Master of Fine Arts degree. In the fall of 2014, the program morphed into a one-year Master of Arts degree in Design Research, Writing, and Criticism.

Program Chair 
Alice Twemlow

Program Co-Founders 
Alice Twemlow
Steven Heller

Faculty 
Alice Twemlow
Steven Heller
Kurt Andersen
Paola Antonelli
Akiko Busch
Ralph Caplan
Andrea Codrington
Justin Davidson
Russell Flinchum
Janet Froelich
Karrie Jacobs
Alexandra Lange
Julie Lasky
Adam Harrison Levy
Elaine Louie
Matilda McQuaid
Leital Molad
Phil Patton
Shax Riegler
Elizabeth Spiers
Karen Stein

Notes

External links 
 D-Crit Web site
 School of Visual Arts Official Homepage

Magazine and online articles 
 
 
 
 danrubinstein.com/2008/10/28/dcrit/
 
 
 www.subtraction.com/2008/05/27/dcrit
 www.core77.com/blog/events/sva_design_criticism_open_house_7436.asp

School of Visual Arts